The Chiles Valley District is an American Viticultural Area (AVA) located in Napa County, California and a sub-region within Napa Valley AVA.  It was established by the  Bureau of Alcohol, Tobacco and Firearms (ATF) on April 19, 1999 after the ATF received the petition from Mr. Volker Eisele, owner of the Volker Eisele Vineyard and Winery proposing a new viticultural area in Napa County to be known as "Chiles Valley District." 

The Chiles Valley is nestled in the Vaca Mountains above the northeast side of the Napa Valley. The most planted grapes in Chiles Valley are Cabernet Sauvignon, Zinfandel, Chardonnay, and Sauvignon Blanc.

History
Chiles Valley was named after Joseph Ballinger Chiles, who received the Rancho Catacula Mexican land grant in the 1841. The area was historically a local source for tin, which was mined by residents in the area as of the 1881. Gypsum has also been found in the southern end of the valley.

References

American Viticultural Areas of the San Francisco Bay Area
Vaca Mountains
Geography of Napa County, California
1999 establishments in California
American Viticultural Areas